A provincial election was held in the Western Cape on 7 May 2014 to elect a new provincial parliament. It was the fifth provincial election held since the end of the apartheid era, and also the first held since the death of Nelson Mandela. Although not constitutionally required, the election was held simultaneously with elections to the National Assembly. The legislature is unicameral, and consists of 42 members elected by a system of party-list proportional representation.

The Western Cape calls its legislature the "Provincial Parliament" and the members "Members of Provincial Parliament (MPPs)". The other provinces use the terms "Provincial Legislature" and "Members of the Provincial Legislature".

The Premier of the Western Cape is chosen by the Provincial Parliament. The incumbent Premier Helen Zille was re-elected.

Results
The Western Cape was the only province not won by the ANC, the DA increased its majority from 51.46% to 59.38%. The African National Congress came in second with 32.89% of the vote, while the newly formed  Economic Freedom Fighters obtained 2.1%. The African Christian Democratic Party gained 1.02% of the vote.

References

2014 elections in South Africa
Elections in the Western Cape